Edward Joseph Biedenbach (born August 12, 1945) is an American former basketball player and  college basketball coach.

Playing career
Born in Pittsburgh, Biedenbach attended Edgewood High School in nearby Edgewood. He played collegiately for the North Carolina State University and was selected first-team All-ACC twice.

He was selected by the St. Louis Hawks in the 9th round (106th pick overall) of the 1967 NBA draft and by the Los Angeles Lakers in the 4th round (45th pick overall) of the 1968 NBA draft. In the 1968–69 season, Biedenbach played seven games for the Phoenix Suns.

Coaching career
He was an assistant coach for the 1973–74 NC State basketball team which won the NCAA championship.

Biedenbach coached at Davidson College and the University of North Carolina at Asheville. He led Asheville to three NCAA tournament appearances. In 2003, they lost to Texas in the first round.

In 2007–08, the UNC Asheville Bulldogs garnered national spotlight attention because of 7'7" center Kenny George. UNCA went 23–10 that season and was runner-up in the Big South tournament. UNCA made the NIT and lost in the first round to Ohio State 84–66.

In 2011, UNCA qualified for the NCAA tournament after winning the Big South tournament. UNCA beat Arkansas-Little Rock in the First Four before losing to Pittsburgh in the Round of 64.

The 2011–2012 season was the most successful season in Asheville basketball history. Led by four seniors (J.P. Primm, Matt Dickey, Chris Stephenson, and Quinard Jackson), the Bulldogs won a school record 24 wins. UNCA won the Big South regular season title. By virtue of winning the Big South tournament, UNCA earned a 16 seed in the NCAA tournament and led 1 seed Syracuse for the majority of the game but lost 72–65 and fell short of becoming the first 16 seed to upset a 1 seed.

On April 2, 2013, Biedenbach resigned from UNC Asheville to take an assistant coaching job under Buzz Peterson at UNC Wilmington. After Peterson was fired, Biedenbach became interim head coach until UNCW hired Kevin Keatts, who did not retain Biedenbach on staff.

Personal life
Biedenbach is the father-in-law of Carolina Hurricanes head coach Rod Brind'Amour. Brind'Amour is married to Biedenbach's daughter, Amy.

Head coaching record

References

External links

UNC Wilmington bio
UNC Asheville bio

1945 births
Living people
American men's basketball players
Basketball coaches from Pennsylvania
Basketball players from Pittsburgh
College men's basketball head coaches in the United States
Davidson Wildcats men's basketball coaches
Los Angeles Lakers draft picks
NC State Wolfpack men's basketball coaches
NC State Wolfpack men's basketball players
Phoenix Suns players
Point guards
Sportspeople from Pittsburgh
St. Louis Hawks draft picks
UNC Asheville Bulldogs men's basketball coaches
UNC Wilmington Seahawks men's basketball coaches